Frank J. Bart (April 15, 1883 – March 31, 1961) was a Medal of Honor recipient for World War I.

Born in New York City, he joined the United States Army in Newark, New Jersey, during World War I, as a private in Company C, 9th Infantry, 2nd Division. He received the Medal of Honor for bravery near Medeah Ferme, France, on October 3, 1918.

He was buried in Flower Hill Cemetery in North Bergen, New Jersey.

Medal of Honor citation

General Orders:  War Department, General Orders No. 16 (January 22, 1919)Action Date:  3-Oct-18Service:  ArmyRank:  PrivateCompany:  Company CRegiment:  9th InfantryDivision:  2d Division 
The President of the United States of America, in the name of Congress, takes pleasure in presenting the Medal of Honor to Private Frank J. Bart (ASN: 38512), United States Army, for extraordinary heroism on 3 October 1918, while serving with Company C, 9th Infantry, 2d Division, in action at Medeah Ferme, France. Private Bart, being on duty as a company runner, when the advance was held up by machinegun fire voluntarily picked up an automatic rifle, ran out ahead of the line, and silenced a hostile machinegun nest, killing the German gunners. The advance then continued, and when it was again hindered shortly afterward by another machinegun nest this courageous soldier repeated his bold exploit by putting the second machinegun out of action.

Military awards and decorations
Bart's military decorations and awards include:

See also

List of Medal of Honor recipients
List of Medal of Honor recipients for World War I

References

1883 births
1961 deaths
United States Army personnel of World War I
United States Army Medal of Honor recipients
United States Army non-commissioned officers
World War I recipients of the Medal of Honor
Military personnel from New York City
Burials at Flower Hill Cemetery (North Bergen, New Jersey)